The 1982 Linfield Wildcats football team was an American football team that represented Linfield University as a member of the Northwest Conference (NWC) during the 1982 NAIA Division II football season. In their 15th season under head coach Ad Rutschman, the Wildcats compiled a perfect 12–0 record and won the NWC championship.

Schedule

References

Linfield Wildcats
Linfield Wildcats football seasons
NAIA Football National Champions
College football undefeated seasons
Linfield Wildcats football